Marseille Observatory is an astronomical observatory located in Marseille, France, with a history that goes back to the early 18th century. In its 1877 incarnation, it was the discovery site of a group of galaxies known as Stephan's Quintet, discovered by its director Édouard Stephan. Marseille Observatory is now run as a joint research unit by Aix-Marseille University and the French National Center for Scientific Research (CNRS).

The old Palais Longchamps facilities are a noted tourist attraction in Marseille, and a planetarium was also added in 2001. One of the noted exhibits is the Foucault glass-mirror telescope, and various items from centuries of astronomical activities.

Foucault's telescope is a noted historical example because it was the forerunner of the modern style of big reflecting telescopes which use a minute layer of metal on a figured piece of glass. Before this, the main technology was to make the whole mirror of metal, and it would really be another half-century before silvered glass mirrors really caught on for astronomy. A major change in the 20th century was to shift from using solution to coat the glass with silver to using a vapor deposition process.

18th century 
The observatory was founded in 1701  in montee des Accoules (this is a location near Vieux Port, Marseille, France). Antoine Laval was the first director.

The 1761 Transit of Venus was observed from the Marseilles Observatory. A  telescope 6 feet long made by James Short was used for this observation. These observations were conducted by the astronomer Louis Lagrange.

In 1789 Jean-Louis Pons began work at Marseille Obs. as a doorkeeper, but he also received lesson in astronomy; by 1801 he discovered his first comet. Pons would become one of the most prolific comet discovers, finding 37 in all a significant portion of all comet discoveries for a quarter of a century.

19th century 
Astronomer Jean-Félix Adolphe Gambart discovered 16 comets from the old observatory. Another astronomer of Marseilles Observatory was Benjamin Valz.

Jean-Louis Pons (1761-1831) discovered his first comet in 1801, and went on to find 37 more in his career much of it at Marsielles Obs.

The Comet Pons-Brook was discovered by J.L. Pons in July 1812, however it was not seen again until June 1883. (The next time it was recovered was in 1953.) Some other famous comets discovered by Pons include 7P/Pons–Winnecke, 12P/Pons–Brooks, and 273P/Pons–Gambart, among many others. (see also Comet Pons)

Pons also discovered comets that came to be known by other names including Encke's Comet, Comet Crommelin, and Biela's Comet. This is not unusual as comet discoveries are sometimes later determined to be re-discoveries of previously observed comets or co-discoveries (discovered at the same time by others). Similarly, some comets were named for the first person to compute the comet's orbit, as in the case of Halley's comet.

In 1863 Marseilles Observatory became a branch of the Paris Observatory. This led to a new building inaugurated by 1864, designed by the architect of Notre Dame de la Garde, also the 80 cm reflector was installed by that year (at the Palais Longchamp site).

Work continued on improvements and by 1866 a Comet Seeker telescope of 18 cm aperture by Martin, and 25.8 cm (10.25") aperture refractor by Merz by 1872. The Merz refractor was on equatorial mounting with governor done by Foucault.

Foucault operated his 80 cm silver-on-glass reflector at Marseille Observatory, a telescope with aperture 80 cm (31.5 inches) from about 1862 to its retirement in 1965.  The telescope was noted for being a pioneering design, that used silver-coated glass in a reflecting telescope.

There was also instruments and facilities for magnetic studies.

1872 Marseilles reported several new nebula discovered using the Eichens searcher.

In 1873 Marseilles Observatory announced the discovery of 300 new nebula. Of these 75 had there positions accurately cataloged, which was done by comparing the location of the nebula with previously cataloged stars of known position.

In 1873 Marseilles Observatory detached from Paris Observatory.

In 1874 the Comet C/1874 H1 was discovered from the observatory.

20th century 
In 1914, the Orion nebula was observed with the Perot-Fabry interferometer.

In 1965 the Foucault 80 cm reflecting telescope was retired.

In 1989 the Marseille telescope was completed at the observatory, and then sent to the southern hemisphere later that year. The telescope is a reflecting telescope with 36 cm (~14.2") diameter mirror with a low-expansion glass-ceramic and of the Richey-Chrétien type.

Starting in 1990 Marseille Observatory had a study of H alpha (H-alpha (Hα)) in the southern galactic plane. This included observations of the Magellanic Clouds also. This study used the 36 cm Marsielle telescope at La Silla observatory in the southern hemisphere for data. The telescope was equipped with both a photon counter and a  Fabry-Perot interferometer for this study.

In 1999 a Marseilles Observatory published a study on simulating the formation of proto-planets and planetesimals with a large planetary body. This simulation used the GRAPE-4 system.

2000s 

In 2000, Marseille Observatory merged with the Laboratoire d'Astrophysique Spatiale to become the Laboratoire d'Astrophysique de Marseille (LAM) within the broader Observatoire Astronomique Marseille Provence which also included the Haute-Provence Observatory.

In 2008, LAM was relocated to a new 10,000 square meter facility in the Technopôle Chateau-Gombert in Marseille. The facility includes two major technology platforms for qualification of space instruments and for fabrication and metrology of optical mirrors. LAM astronomers specialize in cosmology and galaxy evolution, exoplanets and Solar System, and R&D in optics and instrumentation.

In 2012, the Observatoire Astronomique Marseille Provence merged with other earth-sciences research institutes from Aix-Marseille University and became a new entity called the Observatoire des Science de l'Univers Institut Pythéas (OSU-IP) which now includes 6 major labs for earth and universe sciences: CEREGE, IMBE, MIO, LAM. LPED, MIO as well as the Haute-Provence Observatory.

Marseille Observatory Palais Longchamp facilities

The old Marseille Observatory site is a noted tourist attraction in the Palais Longchamp area. Exhibits include the Foucault telescope, and there is also a planetarium.
The planetarium has 30-seats and opened in 2001.

The facilities at Plateau longchamp date the 1860s, the older site was at Vieux Port.

Directors 

 Antoine Laval, 1702-1728 
 Esprit Pézenas, 1729-1763 
 Saint-Jacques de Silvabelle, 1763-1801 
 Jacques-Joseph Thulis, 1801-1810 
 Jean-Jacques Blanpain, 1810-1821 
 Jean-Félix Adolphe Gambart, 1821-1836 
 Benjamin Valz, 1836-1860 
 Charles Simon, known as Darembert, 1861-1863
 Auguste Voigt, 1863-1865
 Édouard Stephan, 1866-1907 
 Henry Bourget, 1907-1921 
 Henri Buisson, (directeur intérimaire) 1921-1923 
 Jean Bosler, 1923-1948 
 Charles Fehrenbach, 1948-1971 
 James Lequeux, 1983-1988 ;
 Roger Malina, 2008-

See also
List of astronomical observatories
List of largest optical telescopes of the 19th century

References

External links
 Laboratoire d'Astrophysique de Marseille, updated Jan. 2014
 OSU-Institut Pythéas, updated Jan. 2014
 Observatoire de Haute Provence, updated Jan. 2014
Marseille Observatory Astronomical Museum
Publications of Marseille Observatory digitalized on Paris Observatory digital library

Astronomical observatories in France
Museums in France